Archaeatropidae is an extinct family of Psocoptera in the suborder Trogiomorpha.

Genera 

 †Archaeatropos Baz and Ortuño 2000 
 †Archaeatropos alavensis Baz and Ortuño 2000 Spanish amber, Albian
 †Archaeatropos perantiqua (Cockerell 1919) Burmese amber, Myanmar, Cenomanian
 †Archaeatropos randatae (Azar and Nel 2004) Lebanese amber, Barremian
†Bcharreglaris Azar and Nel 2004 
†Bcharreglaris amooni Kaddumi 2007 Jordanian amber, Albian
†Bcharreglaris amunobi Azar and Nel 2004 Lebanese amber, Barremian
†Bcharreglaris haddadini Kaddumi 2007 Jordanian amber, Albian
†Libanoglaris Azar et al. 2003 Lebanese amber, Barremian
†Libanoglaris chehabi Azar and Nel 2004
†Libanoglaris mouawadi Azar et al. 2003 
†Proprionoglaris Perrichot et al. 2003 
†Proprionoglaris axioperierga Azar et al. 2014 Vendée amber, France, Turonian
†Proprionoglaris guyoti Perrichot et al. 2003 Charentese amber, France, Cenomanian
†Prospeleketor Perrichot et al. 2003
†Prospeleketor albianensis Perrichot et al. 2003 Charentese amber, France, Cenomanian
†Setoglaris Azar and Nel 2004 
†Setoglaris reemae Azar and Nel 2004 Lebanese amber, Barremian

References

Trogiomorpha
Prehistoric insect families